School of Arts or school of arts may refer to:

Art school, an educational institution with a primary focus on the visual arts
Mechanics' institutes, Victorian-era educational establishments formed to provide education, particularly in technical subjects, to working men, sometimes called School of Arts
 School of Arts, Lahore, Pakistan
 School of Arts of Edinburgh, the forerunner of Mechanics' institutes
 School of Arts, part of Hogeschool Gent

See also
 School of Art and Design (disambiguation)
 School of Arts and Crafts of Toledo, 19th century school for the training of artists and craftsmen in Toledo, Spain
 School of the Arts (disambiguation)
 Yale School of Art, first professional art school in the U.S.